The 2014 Winston-Salem Cycling Classic was a one-day women's cycle race held in Winston-Salem, North Carolina, on April 18, 2014. The race had an UCI rating of 1.2.

Results

See also
 2014 in women's road cycling

References

2014 in American sports
2014 in women's road cycling
Women's road bicycle races